KDRS-FM (107.1 FM, "Jack FM") is a radio station broadcasting an adult hits format. Licensed to Paragould, Arkansas, United States, it serves the Jonesboro area.  The station is currently owned by Mor Media, Inc.

External links

DRS-FM
Jack FM stations
Adult hits radio stations in the United States